Kahya may refer to:
Kahya, Iran, a village in Zanjan Province, Iran
Ekrem Kahya, Turkish footballer
Ramazan Kahya, Turkish footballer
variant phonetic rendering of the Ottoman title kethüda

See also
Kahina

Turkish-language surnames